Kaweni is a village in the commune of Mamoudzou on the French overseas island of Mayotte.

Populated places in Mayotte
Mamoudzou